Alexander Martinek (25 April 1919 – 8 July 1944) was an Austrian footballer who played as a goalkeeper for Kremser SC, Wacker Wien, Hamburger SV, HSV Groß Born and the Germany national team.

References

1919 births
1944 deaths
Association football goalkeepers
Austrian footballers
Germany international footballers
Hamburger SV players
German footballers
Austrian military personnel killed in World War II
People from Krems an der Donau
Footballers from Lower Austria